"Say Forever You'll Be Mine" is a song written and recorded by American country music artist Dolly Parton as a duet with American country music artist Porter Wagoner.  It was released in August 1975 as the first single from their album Say Forever You'll Be Mine.  The song peaked at number 5 on the Billboard Hot Country Singles chart. It also reached number 1 on the RPM Country Tracks chart in Canada.

Chart performance

References

1975 singles
Dolly Parton songs
Porter Wagoner songs
Songs written by Dolly Parton
Male–female vocal duets
RCA Records singles
Song recordings produced by Bob Ferguson (musician)
1975 songs